This is a list of all offshore islands that belong to Germany, which are found in the North and Baltic Seas.  In addition, some islands in inland waters are also listed.

Largest islands

 72 km² are part of Poland

Islands of the Baltic Sea

Fehmarn
Poel
Walfisch island
Langenwerder
Hiddensee
Rügen
Dänholm
Vilm
Greifswalder Oie
Ruden
Ummanz
Usedom (partly belonging to Poland)

Islands of the North Sea

Heligoland
East Frisian Islands (in the Wadden Sea)
Borkum
Buise (former island, disappeared)
Lütje Hörn
Kachelotplate
Memmert
Juist
Norderney
Baltrum
Langeoog
Spiekeroog
Wangerooge
Mellum
Neuwerk
Scharhörn
Nigehörn
North Frisian Islands
Sylt
Föhr
Amrum
Pellworm
Nordstrand (former island, now peninsula)
Halligen (also part of North Frisian Islands)
Langeneß
Norderoog
Süderoog
Nordstrandischmoor
Oland (German island)
Südfall
Gröde-Appelland
Hooge
Hallig Habel
Hamburger Hallig

Islands of Elbe River
Lühesand

Islands of Weser River
Harriersand

Islands of Lake Constance
Mainau Island
Reichenau Island
Lindau

Islands of Chiemsee
Herrenchiemsee
Frauenchiemsee
Krautinsel

See also
Weiße Insel des Südens
List of islands in the Baltic Sea
List of islands

External links 

Islands - Germany Tourism

References 

Germany
Islands